Deniaud is a French surname. Notable people with the surname include:

Dominique Deniaud (born 1977), French ice dancer
Thomas Deniaud (born 1971), French footballer
Yves Deniaud (disambiguation), multiple people

French-language surnames